Andrew MacMillan OBE RSA FRIAS RIBA (11 December 1928, Maryhill, Glasgow - 16 August 2014, Inverness) was a Scottish architect, educator, writer and broadcaster. He served as head of the Mackintosh School of Architecture in Glasgow between 1973 and 1994 and was awarded the Royal Society of Arts gold medal (1975) and the inaugural lifetime achievement award of the Royal Incorporation of Architects in Scotland. In 1986 he was Davenport Visiting Professor at Yale University.

MacMillan joined his lifelong friend Isi Metzstein at Gillespie, Kidd & Coia in 1954 and the pair went on to become the firm's lead designers, both becoming partners in the business in 1966.

He was appointed an Officer of the Order of the British Empire in 1992.

National Life Stories conducted an oral history interview (C467/112) with Andy MacMillan in 2013 for its Architects Lives' collection held by the British Library.

Works
 Church of St Paul, Glenrothes, 1957
 Bellshill Maternity Hospital and Nurses Home
 schools in Cumbernauld, Simshill, Langside, Pollock and Glasgow
 St Mary of the Angels, Falkirk
 St Joseph's Church, Duntocher
 St Bride's, East Kilbride
 St Patrick's, Kilsyth
 St Benedict's, Easterhouse
 Our Lady of Good Counsel, Glasgow
 St Peter's Seminary, Cardross, the first modern building to be awarded Category-A listed status
 halls of residence at the University of Hull (1963–7)
 Alterations and additions to Wadham College, Oxford (1971–7)
 Robinson College, Cambridge (1974–80)
 Craobh Haven, Argyll

Television series
 Six Scottish Burghs, Pencil of Light for BBC Scotland, produced and directed by Ken Macgregor

See also
The Artist's Cottage project
House for an Art Lover
Robert Macintyre

References

1928 births
2014 deaths
20th-century Scottish architects
Scottish architecture writers
Scottish television writers
Scottish television presenters
Scottish educators
Architecture academics
Alumni of the Glasgow School of Art
Academics of the University of Glasgow
Academics of the University of Strathclyde
Academics of University College Dublin
Royal Scottish Academicians
Officers of the Order of the British Empire
Architects from Glasgow
Yale School of Architecture faculty
Fellows of the Royal Incorporation of Architects in Scotland
People from Maryhill